Chad Brownlee is the debut studio album by Canadian country music artist Chad Brownlee. It was released on August 31, 2010 by MDM Recordings. The album's third single, "Hood of My Car," charted on the Canadian Hot 100.

Track listing

Chart performance

Singles

References

External links
[ Chad Brownlee] at Allmusic

2010 debut albums
Chad Brownlee albums
MDM Recordings albums